The ladies' singles was one of four events in figure skating at the 1908 Summer Olympics. Each nation could enter up to 3 skaters. Without rivals Jenny Herz and Lily Kronberger present at the Olympics, Great Britain's Madge Syers easily won the gold medal.

Competition format

Each skater had to complete a set of compulsory figures, with a possible score from those figures of 168. There were 5 figures which had to completed in both directions and 1 figure that was completed in only one direction (resulting in a total of 11 figures). Each figure was repeated three times. Marks were given for each figure from 0 to 6 (in half-point increments), then multiplied by a difficulty factor for that figure. 

Each skater also performed a free skate of four minutes, with a score of up to 108. Scores from 0 to 6 were given for each of (a) content (difficulty and variety) and (b) performance. The total was multiplied by 9.

The maximum total possible score was therefore 276. Each judge would then arrange the skaters in order of total score by that judge; these ordinal rankings were used to provide final placement for the skaters, using a "majority rule"--if a majority of the judges ranked a pair first, the pair won. If there was no majority, the total ordinals controlled.  Ties were broken by total points.

Results

The judges were unanimous in ranking Syers first, awarding her the gold medal. Rendschmidt earned second-place marks from a majority of the judges (4 of the 5) to take silver. Greenhough-Smith had a majority of the third-place marks (3 of 5), along with a second-place result, to earn the bronze. Montgomery took fourth place with 4 of the 5 judges giving her that rank. Lycett finished last; though one judge ranked her third, the remaining 4 placed her in fifth.

Referee:
  Herbert G. Fowler

Judges:
  Harry D. Faith
  Edvard Hörle
  Gustav Hügel
  Georg Sanders
  Hermann Wendt

References

Sources
 
 De Wael, Herman. Herman's Full Olympians: "Figure skating 1908". Accessed 2 May 2006.

Women's individual
1908 in figure skating
Oly
Fig